Patrick Beljaards (born 4 March 1978, in Haarlem) is a Dutch baseball player.

Beljaards represented the Netherlands at the 2000 Summer Olympics in Sydney where he and his team became fifth. Four years later at the 2004 Summer Olympics in Athens they were sixth. Beljaards played his last full season in 2011, then retired.

References

External links
Beljaards at the Dutch Olympic Archive

1978 births
Living people
Baseball players at the 2000 Summer Olympics
Baseball players at the 2004 Summer Olympics
Olympic baseball players of the Netherlands
Dutch baseball players
Sportspeople from Haarlem
Corendon Kinheim players